Daniel Robert Bance (born 27 September 1982) is an English footballer who plays as a midfielder for Bodmin Town.

Bance was born in Plymouth. He began his career as an apprentice with Football League club Plymouth Argyle and progressed through the club's youth system to make his first team debut on 16 April 2001 in a 3–0 defeat at Kidderminster Harriers. He was substituted after 49 minutes and it proved to be his only appearance in the professional game. Bance joined Southern League side Weymouth on trial in July 2001 with a view to joining the club on loan. He was released by Plymouth Argyle in the summer of 2002 and then signed a two-year contract with Taunton Town. He then joined St Blazey, where he won the South Western League championship in 2005 and 2007, and later captained the side. Bance moved to Liskeard Athletic in January 2010. Seven months later, he signed for Bodmin Town.

Honours
St Blazey
South Western League: 2004–2005, 2006–2007

References

External links

1982 births
Living people
Footballers from Plymouth, Devon
English footballers
Association football midfielders
Plymouth Argyle F.C. players
Taunton Town F.C. players
St Blazey A.F.C. players
Liskeard Athletic F.C. players
Bodmin Town F.C. players
English Football League players
Southern Football League players